Resolution is the third studio album by American singer-songwriter Andy Pratt, released in 1976 by Nemperor, and distributed by Atlantic. It was Pratt's first album of entirely new music since his second Andy Pratt in 1973. The album was produced by Bee Gees producer Arif Mardin, who was recruited for a more commercial approach.

On release, Pratt received a positive critical reception, it is also his best selling album, but had only modest commercial success.

Critical reception
The album has consistently been praised by critics. Reviewing the album Rolling Stone magazine wrote, "By reviving the dream of rock as an art and then re-inventing it, Pratt has forever changed the face of rock".  And in a retrospective review for AllMusic, critic Michael Ofjord gave the album four and a half out of five stars and wrote that "Although this album never attained the commercial success that many predicted, it remains a classic that deserves to be heard by a wide audience."

On the other hand, reviewing the album in his consumer guide for The Village Voice, Robert Christgau gave the album a B and claimed that the album is "Sententious pop at its best, recommended only to those whose taste for such junk amounts to a jones."

Track listing

Personnel
Credits are adapted from the album's liner notes.
Andy Pratt – lead and background vocals; piano; percussion
Mark Doyle – lead and bass guitars; piano; percussion
Andy Mendelson – organ; synthesizer
Ken Bichel – synthesizer; mellotron
Richard Mendelson – drums; percussion
Andy Newmark – drums
Stephen Gadd – drums
Tony Levin – bass guitars
Hugh McDonald – bass guitars
Arif Mardin – string arrangements; horn arrangements; percussion
Ruben Bassini – percussion
Carlos Martin – congas
The Rowans – backing vocals
Luther Vandross – backing vocals
David Lasley – backing vocals
Diane Sumler – backing vocals

Chart performance

Peak position

References

External links

Albums produced by Arif Mardin
Andy Pratt (singer-songwriter) albums
1976 albums